Danilo is a masculine given name. 

Danilo may also refer to:

People with the surname
 Jules Danilo (born 1995), Italian-born French motorcycle racer
 Paul Danilo (1919–2013), American soccer player, coach and administrator

Other uses
 Danilo, Croatia, a village

See also
 Danilo culture, a Neolithic culture located on the Dalmatian coast of Croatia and in parts of Bosnia